The San Joaquin County Historical Society and Museum is located at Micke Grove Regional Park, between Lodi, California and Stockton, California. It was established in 1966 by San Joaquin County and the San Joaquin County Historical Society.

Their collections have grown from a few hundred items from the estate of William G. and Julia Harrison Micke to over 75,000 artifacts and over 500,000 documents and photos representative of the development of San Joaquin County. The museum was accredited by the American Alliance of Museums in 1973.

Exhibits 
 The Helen Weber Kennedy Gallery: a comprehensive exhibit showcasing the history of Charles Weber, founder of Stockton and his family.
 The Native American Gallery: an exhibit showcasing the economic and social cultures of local Yokuts and Miwok tribes in the San Joaquin valley.
 The Floyd Locher Tool Collection: the largest tool collection in the United States west of the Mississippi River.
 The Sunshine Trail: an outdoor ecological history exhibit that takes visitors through the diverse ecosystems of the Sierra Nevada, foothills, and San Joaquin valley.
 Innovations in Agriculture: showcasing San Joaquin County's contributions to global agricultural technology.
 Historic Structures: across the museum complex visitors can view the Calaveras Schoolhouse from 1884, the Charles Weber cottage, and the Victorian style of the Julia Weber House.
 Tractors and Earth Moving Equipment: the museum hosts three large exhibits dedicated to tractors, scrapers, and bulldozers invented and manufactured in San Joaquin County, including machinery from the Holt Manufacturing Company, R. G. LeTourneau, and Samson Iron Works.

Education 
The Museum operates a Docent Program, where adults take a one-year course in local history and education. Upon graduation, docents are expected to work as volunteer educators for various museum programs.

Living History 
The museum docents operate several living history programs for elementary school students throughout San Joaquin County. These programs help students learn about everyday life in the 19th and early 20th centuries, and provide context to the state history content that they learn in school.

The three primary living history programs are Valley Days, where students learn 19th century skills such as gold panning, blacksmithing, and corn grinding, Pioneer School, where students take a day of class in the Calaveras School House using the official California State Curriculum of 1884, and Farm to Fork, where students simulate the farming industry.

Tours and Trunks 
The museum docents  give tours to visitors.  The docents also operate the celebrated Grandmother's/Grandfather's Trunk program, where docents visit schools in pioneer clothing with trunks full of artifacts, which through interpretive explanation can help students learn about 19th century life.

Archive 
The museum also hosts the archives of San Joaquin County, with over 500,000 documents and photos available to the public for research. The archive includes:

 The Weber family collections and the personal records and business dealings of the Weber family.
 The Tillie Lewis collection, including the personal scrapbooks and papers of Tillie Lewis.
 Reclamation collections, with historical documentation on water rights, mosquito abatement, and legal reclamation in the Sacramento-San Joaquin Delta.
 Yearbooks from High Schools throughout San Joaquin County, including Stockton, Lodi, Tokay, Ripon, Tracy, Lincoln, St. Mary's, and Edison High School.
 Local genealogical records, including the First Families of San Joaquin collection, formerly the Pioneer Registry of San Joaquin County.
 The municipal records of San Joaquin County, including the official minute books of the San Joaquin County Board of Supervisors, assessment and plat books, local infrastructure records, marriage and death records, the Great Registry of Voters for San Joaquin County, and Sanborn maps for Stockton, Lodi, and Clements, California.
 Agricultural Technology Manuals.
Chinese-language business records from the Chinese community in Stockton.
 Over 150 independent collections concerning manufacturing, logistics, and agricultural businesses in San Joaquin County.

References

External links 
 the Online Archive of California
  Official San Joaquin County Historical Society and Museum website

Museums in San Joaquin County, California
Lodi, California
Historical society museums in California
History of the San Joaquin Valley
Agriculture museums in the United States
Farm museums in California
Open-air museums in California
Institutions accredited by the American Alliance of Museums
Historical societies in California
History museums in California
Museums established in 1966
1966 establishments in California